Marion Poschmann (born 15 December 1969 in Essen) is a German author, novelist, and poet.

Life 
Marion Poschmann grew up in Mülheim an der Ruhr and Essen. From 1989 to 1995 she studied German, philosophy, and Slavic studies in Bonn and Berlin. Her novel The Pine Islands was shortlisted for Man Booker International Prize in 2019.

Selected works 
 Baden bei Gewitter. Frankfurter Verlags-Anstalt, Frankfurt am Main 2002, .
 Verschlossene Kammern. zu Klampen, Lüneburg 2002, .
 Grund zu Schafen. Frankfurter Verlags-Anstalt, Frankfurt am Main 2004, .
 Schwarzweißroman. Frankfurter Verlags-Anstalt, Frankfurt am Main 2005, .
 Hundenovelle. Frankfurter Verlags-Anstalt, Frankfurt am Main 2008, .
 Geistersehen. Suhrkamp, Berlin 2010, .
 Die Sonnenposition. Suhrkamp, Berlin 2013, .
 Mondbetrachtung in mondloser Nacht. Über Dichtung. Suhrkamp, Berlin 2016, .
 Geliehene Landschaften. Lehrgedichte und Elegien. Suhrkamp, Berlin 2016, .
 Die Kieferninseln. Suhrkamp, Berlin 2017, .
English-language edition: The Pine Islands. Translated by Jen Calleja. Serpent's Tail, London 2019, .

Awards 
Source:

 2003 Wolfgang Weyrauch Promotional Prize
 2004 scholarship from the German Academy Rome Villa Massimo
 2005 Hans-Erich-Nossack-Förderpreis
 2005 Literature Prize Ruhr area
 2005 Nominated for the German Book Prize (long list)
 2006 Literature Prize of the City of Meersburg
 2007 sponsorship award from the state of North Rhine-Westphalia
 2009 Art Prize for Literature from the Brandenburg Lotto GmbH
 2011 Peter Huchel Prize
 2011 Ernst Meister Prize
 2012 New York grant from the German Literature Fund
 2013 Nominated for the German Book Prize (shortlist)
 2013 Wilhelm Raabe Literature Prize
 2015 Thomas Kling Poetics Lectureship
 2016 Nominated for the Leipzig Book Fair Prize
 2017 German Prize for Nature Writing
 2017 Düsseldorf Literature Prize
 2017 Nominated for the German Book Prize (shortlist)
 2018 Berlin Literature Prize, combined with the guest professorship for German-language poetics at the Free University of Berlin
 2018 Klopstock Prize for New Literature
 2019 Nominated for the Man Booker International Prize (Shortlisted) for The Pine Islands
 2019 Zurich Poetics Lecture
 2020 Liliencron lectureship for poetry
 2020 Poetry Prize Orphil
 2020 Hölty Prize for Poetry
 2021 Bremen Literature Prize
 2021 Word Requests Literature Prize for critical short texts
 2022/2023 Stadtschreiber von Bergen

References

External links 
 

1969 births
Living people
21st-century German novelists
21st-century German women writers
German women novelists